Saidpur Theh is a village in Shaheed Bhagat Singh Nagar district of Punjab State, India. The village is administrated by Sarpanch an elected representative of the village.

Demography 
As of 2011, Saidpur Theh has a total number of 20 houses and population of 97 of which 46 include are males while 51 are females according to the report published by Census India in 2011. The literacy rate of Saidpur Theh is 81.40% higher than the state average of 75.84%. The population of children under the age of 6 years is 11 which is 11.34% of total population of Saidpur Theh, and child sex ratio is approximately 833 as compared to Punjab state average of 846.

As per the report published by Census India in 2011, 36 people were engaged in work activities out of the total population of Saidpur Theh which includes 30 males and 6 females. According to census survey report 2011, 100% workers describe their work as main work and 0% workers are involved in Marginal activity providing livelihood for less than 6 months.

Education 
KC Engineering College and Doaba Khalsa Trust Group Of Institutions are the nearest colleges.

List of schools nearby:
Govt Primary School, Sadhpur
Govt High School, Saidpur Kalan
Govt Senior Secondary School, Ladhana Jhikka
Govt High School, Jhander Kalan
Guru Ram Dass Public School, Cheta

Transport 

See also 
List of villages in India

References

External links 
 Tourism of Punjab
 Census of Punjab
 Locality Based PINCode

Villages in Shaheed Bhagat Singh Nagar district